This article contains information about the literary events and publications of 1970.

Events
January 16 – The Düsseldorfer Schauspielhaus opens with a performance of Georg Büchner's Dantons Tod.
March – Magdalena Mouján's story "Gu ta Gutarrak" ("We and Ours") in Basque is suppressed by the authorities in Francoist Spain.
June 10 – The English novelist Anthony Burgess delivers an inflammatory lecture, "Obscenity and the Arts", at the University of Malta; its reception leads to him leaving Malta. He has begun a novel that will become Earthly Powers (1980).
June 17 – The première of David Storey's play Home at the Royal Court Theatre, London, is directed by Lindsay Anderson and stars Sir John Gielgud and Sir Ralph Richardson.
July 7 – The English publisher Sir Allen Lane dies (born 1902). On August 21 his paperback imprint Penguin Books is acquired by Pearson.
August 27 – England's Royal Shakespeare Company introduces a revolutionary production of Shakespeare's A Midsummer Night's Dream directed by Peter Brook, at the Royal Shakespeare Theatre, Stratford-upon-Avon.
November 20 – The playwright Fadil Paçrami becomes Chairman of the Parliament of Albania.
November 25 – In Tokyo, the Japanese author and Tatenokai militia leader Yukio Mishima (三島由紀夫, 45) and others take over the headquarters of the Japan Self-Defense Forces in an attempted coup d'état. Mishima's speech commits seppuku (public ritual suicide) when he fails to sway the public to his right-wing politics, which include restoring the powers of the Emperor.
December 5 – Dario Fo premières his play Accidental Death of an Anarchist (Morte accidentale di un anarchico) at Varese in Italy.
unknown dates
Len Deighton's Bomber, set in 1943, becomes the first published novel to have been written on a word processor, an IBM MT/ST.
The novel Deliverance by the American poet James Dickey is published; it will go on to be named among the 100 best English-language novels of the 20th century by an editorial board of the American Modern Library.
An unexpurgated edition of John Cleland's Fanny Hill (Memoirs of a Woman of Pleasure, 1748–1749) appears in the U.K. without legal challenge.
Bohumil Hrabal's books Domácí úkoly (Home Work) and Poupata (Buds) are suppressed by the communist authorities in Czechoslovakia.

New books

Fiction
Dritëro Agolli – Komisari Memo (Commissar Memo)
Poul Anderson – Tau Zero
Abdelhamid ben Hadouga - The South Wind (novel)
Thomas Berger – Vital Parts
Thomas Bernhard – The Lime Works (Das Kalkwerk)
Melvyn Bragg – A Place in England
John Braine – Stay with Me Till Morning
Wallace Breem – Eagle in the Snow
Jimmy Breslin – The Gang That Couldn't Shoot Straight
Taylor Caldwell – Great Lion of God
John Dickson Carr – The Ghosts' High Noon
Agatha Christie – Passenger to Frankfurt
Robertson Davies – Fifth Business
L. Sprague de Camp
The Reluctant Shaman and Other Fantastic Tales
Warlocks and Warriors (ed.)
Samuel R. Delany – The Fall of the Towers (trilogy)
Michel Déon – Les Poneys sauvages
James Dickey – Deliverance
José Donoso – The Obscene Bird of Night (El obsceno pájaro de la noche)
Lawrence Durrell – Nunquam
Vincent Eri – The Crocodile
Nuruddin Farah – From a Crooked Rib
J. G. Farrell – Troubles
Juan Goytisolo – Count Julian (Reivindicación del conde don Julián)
 L.P. Hartley – My Sisters' Keeper
Anne Hébert – Kamouraska
Ernest Hemingway – Islands in the Stream
Susan Hill – I'm the King of the Castle
Pamela Hansford Johnson – The Honours Board
Anna Kavan – Julia and the Bazooka
Jaan Kross – Between Three Plagues (part 1)
Halldór Laxness – Innansveitarkronika
Ira Levin – This Perfect Day
Mario Levrero – La ciudad
H. P. Lovecraft – The Horror in the Museum and Other Revisions
John D. MacDonald – The Long Lavender Look
Eric Malpass – Oh My Darling Daughter
Ngaio Marsh – When in Rome
Yukio Mishima (三島由紀夫) – The Decay of the Angel (天人五衰, Tennin Gosui; last in The Sea of Fertility tetralogy)
Brian Moore – Fergus
Toni Morrison – The Bluest Eye
Larry Niven – Ringworld
John Jay Osborn, Jr. – The Paper Chase
Mary Renault – Fire from Heaven
Kurban Said – Ali and Nino
Erich Segal – Love Story
Sidney Sheldon – The Naked Face
Clark Ashton Smith – Other Dimensions
Manuel Scorza – Drums for Rancas
Muriel Spark – The Driver's Seat
Mary Stewart – The Crystal Cave
Alan Sillitoe – A Start in Life
Leon Uris – QB VII
Jack Vance – The Pnume
Gore Vidal – Two Sisters
Patrick White – The Vivisector
Venedikt Yerofeyev – Moscow-Petushki (Moscow to the End of the Line; samizdat publication)
Roger Zelazny – Nine Princes in Amber

Children and young people
Lloyd Alexander – The Marvelous Misadventures of Sebastian
Rev. W. Awdry – Duke the lost Engine (twenty-fifth in The Railway Series of 42 books by him and his son Christopher Awdry)
Richard Bach – Jonathan Livingston Seagull
Nina Bawden – The Birds on the Trees
Judy Blume – Are You There, God? It's Me, Margaret
John Burningham – Mr Gumpy's Outing
Betsy Byars – Summer of the Swans
John Christopher (Sam Youd) – The Guardians (science fiction)
Roald Dahl – Fantastic Mr Fox
Leon Garfield and Edward Blishen – The God Beneath the Sea
Ruth Manning-Sanders – A Book of Devils and Demons
Dr. Seuss – Mr. Brown Can Moo! Can You?
Ruth Park
The Muddle-Headed Wombat in the Springtime
The Muddle-Headed Wombat on the River
Bill Peet
The Whingdingdilly
The Wump World
Maurice Sendak – In the Night Kitchen
Isaac Bashevis Singer – A Day of Pleasure: Stories of a Boy Growing Up in Warsaw
E. B. White – The Trumpet Of The Swan
Annette Tison and Talus Taylor - Barbapapa

Drama
Ama Ata Aidoo – Anowa
Robert Bolt – Vivat! Vivat Regina!
Dario Fo – Accidental Death of an Anarchist
Michael Frayn – The Two of Us (4 1-act plays)
Trevor Griffiths – Occupations
Christopher Hampton – The Philanthropist
Lorraine Hansberry – Les Blancs
Welcome Msomi – uMabatha
Terence Rattigan – A Bequest to the Nation
Anthony Shaffer – Sleuth
Alexander Vampilov – Duck Hunting («Утиная охота», Utinaya okhota, published; first performed 1976)
Derek Walcott – Dream on Monkey Mountain

Poetry

L. Sprague de Camp – Demons and Dinosaurs
Ted Hughes – Crow

Non-fiction
Theodor W. Adorno (posthumously) – Aesthetic Theory (Asthetische Theorie)
Hannah Arendt – On Violence
Roland Barthes – S/Z
Pierre Berton – The National Dream
Jim Bouton – Ball Four
Dee Brown – Bury My Heart at Wounded Knee
James MacGregor Burns – Roosevelt: The Soldier Of Freedom
Henri Charrière – Papillon
Elizabeth David – Spices, Salt and Aromatics in the English Kitchen
Edward De Bono – Lateral Thinking: creativity step by step
August Derleth – Thirty Years of Arkham House, 1939-1969: A History and Bibliography
Michel Foucault – Les Mots et les choses: Une archéologie des sciences humaines (The Order of Things: An Archaeology of the Human Sciences)
Germaine Greer – The Female Eunuch
Helene Hanff – 84 Charing Cross Road
Arthur Janov – The Primal Scream
Uwe Johnson – Anniversaries. From the Life of Gesine Cresspahl (Jahrestage: Aus dem Leben von Gesine Cresspahl; begins publication)
Christopher Lloyd – The Well-Tempered Garden
Norman Mailer – Of a Fire on the Moon
Dumas Malone – Jefferson the President: First Term, 1801-1805
Mahathir bin Mohamad – The Malay Dilemma
Kate Millet – Sexual Politics
Nancy Mitford – Frederick the Great
Robin Morgan (ed.) – Sisterhood Is Powerful: An Anthology of Writings from the Women's Liberation Movement
Harold Perkin – The Age of the Railway
J. B. Priestley – The Edwardians
Albert Speer – Inside the Third Reich
Alvin Toffler – Future Shock

Births
January 25 – Stephen Chbosky, American novelist and screenwriter
February 28 – Daniel Handler, American novelist
March 6 – Simona Vinci, Italian fiction writer
March 12 – Dave Eggers, American writer, editor and publisher
March 20 – Michele Jaffe, American author
March 26 – Martin McDonagh, British-born Irish playwright
May 20 – Dorthe Nors, Danish fiction writer
May 26 – Alex Garland, English novelist
June 6 – Sarah Dessen, American novelist
July 22 – Doug Johnstone, Scottish crime fiction writer
August 27 - Ann Aguirre, American speculative fiction writer
September 10 – Phaswane Mpe, South African novelist (died 2004)
September 16 – Nick Sagan, American novelist and screenwriter
October 27 – Jonathan Stroud, English fantasy writer
November 7 – Chris Adrian, American novelist
November 24 – Marlon James, Jamaican novelist
November 27 – Han Kang, South Korean novelist
December 21 – Mohamedou Ould Salahi, Mauritanian author and former Guantánamo detainee 
unknown dates
Raja'a Alem, Saudi Arabian writer
Roberta Dapunt, Italian poet
Nathan Englander, American novelist and short story writer
Neel Mukherjee, Indian novelist
Faruk Šehić, Bosnian poet and fiction writer

Deaths
January 10 – Charles Olson, American modernist poet (liver cancer, born 1910)
January 29 – B. H. Liddell Hart, English military historian (born 1895)
February 2 – Bertrand Russell, English philosopher (born 1872)
February 4 – Louise Bogan, American poet (born 1897)
February 20 – Sophie Treadwell, American dramatist and journalist (born 1885)
February 21 – Johannes Semper, Estonian writer, translator and politician (born 1892)
March 11 – Erle Stanley Gardner, American writer (born 1889)
March 15 – Arthur Adamov, Russian-French playwright (born 1908)
March 21 – Marlen Haushofer, Austrian novelist (born 1920)
March 29 – Vera Brittain, English novelist, memoirist and poet (born 1893)
April 11 – John O'Hara, American novelist (cardiovascular disease, born 1905)
May 7 – Jack Jones, Welsh novelist (born 1884)
May 12 – Nelly Sachs, Jewish German poet and dramatist (born 1891)
June 2 – Giuseppe Ungaretti, Italian modernist poet and writer (born 1888)
June 3 – Ruth Sawyer, American children's writer and novelist (born 1880)
June 7 – E. M. Forster, English novelist (born 1879)
June 16 – Elsa Triolet, French novelist (born 1896)
July 15 – Eric Berne, Canadian-born psychiatrist and author (heart attack, born 1910)
September 1 – François Mauriac, French novelist (born 1885)
September 25 – Erich Maria Remarque, German novelist (All Quiet On The Western Front) (born 1898)
September 28 – John Dos Passos, American novelist (born 1896)
October 18 – Máirtín Ó Cadhain, Irish language writer (born 1906)
November 23 – Alf Prøysen, Norwegian author, musician and children's writer (born 1914)
November 25 – Yukio Mishima (三島 由紀夫), Japanese author (seppuku, born 1925)
unknown date – Racey Helps, English children's author and illustrator (born 1913)

Awards
Nobel Prize for Literature: Aleksandr Solzhenitsyn

Canada
See 1970 Governor General's Awards for a complete list of winners and finalists for those awards.

France
Prix Goncourt: Michel Tournier, Le Roi des Aulnes
Prix Médicis French: Camille Bourniquel, Sélinonte ou la Chambre impériale
Prix Médicis International: Luigi Malerba, Saut de la mort

United Kingdom
Booker Prize: Bernice Rubens, The Elected Member
Carnegie Medal for children's literature: Leon Garfield and Edward Blishen, The God Beneath the Sea
Cholmondeley Award: Kathleen Raine, Douglas Livingstone, Edward Brathwaite
Eric Gregory Award: Helen Frye, Paul Mills, John Mole, Brian Morse, Alan Perry, Richard Tibbitts
James Tait Black Memorial Prize for fiction: Lily Powell, The Bird of Paradise
James Tait Black Memorial Prize for biography: Jasper Ridley, Lord Palmerston
Queen's Gold Medal for Poetry: Roy Fuller

United States
Hugo Award: Ursula K. Le Guin, The Left Hand of Darkness
Nebula Award: Larry Niven, Ringworld
Newbery Medal for children's literature: William H. Armstrong, Sounder
Pulitzer Prize for Drama: Charles Gordone, No Place To Be Somebody
Pulitzer Prize for Fiction: Jean Stafford, Collected Stories
Pulitzer Prize for Poetry: Richard Howard, Untitled Subjects

Elsewhere
Miles Franklin Award: Dal Stivens, A Horse of Air
Alfaguara Prize: Carlos Droguett, Todas esas muertes
Premio Nadal: Jesús Fernández Santos, Libro de las memorias de las cosas
Viareggio Prize: Nello Saito, Dentro e fuori

Notes

References

 
Years of the 20th century in literature